The Zugerbergbahn is a funicular railway in the southern-eastern suburbs of the Swiss city of Zug, in the canton of Zug. The line links the Zug suburb of Schönegg with the Zugerberg mountain overlooking the city and Lake Zug. The line has a length of 1280 m and a difference of elevation of 366 m.

It is operated by the  company Zugerbergbahn AG.

History 
The line opened in the spring of 1907, and was owned and operated by the Zuger Berg- und Strassenbahn AG (ZBB). This company also operated a connecting  electric tramway that linked Schönegg with Zug railway station. In 1959, the ZBB replaced its tram service with a bus service, and this was transferred to the  bus company in 1999. At the same time, the ZBB adopted the name Zugerbergbahn AG.

The cars were first replaced in 1931, whilst the lower and upper stations were rebuilt in 1950-52 and 1970/71 respectively. The railway was comprehensively modernized and renovated in 1984, when a third generation of cars was installed. Further renovation work carried out in 2009, when new fourth generation panoramic cars were installed and the line adapted for use by wheelchair users.

Operation 
The line operates every 30 minutes from 06:00 (07:00 on Saturdays and Sundays) to 23:00. It has the following parameters:

Bus service 11 of the Zugerland Verkehrsbetriebe connects the lower station of the funicular with the centre of Zug and Zug railway station, with buses connecting with all scheduled funicular services.

See also 
 List of funicular railways
 List of funiculars in Switzerland

References

External links 
 
Official web site of the Zugerbergbahn (in German)

Funicular railways in Switzerland
Transport in the canton of Zug
985 mm gauge railways